Pentachlaena latifolia is a plant in the family Sarcolaenaceae. It is endemic to Madagascar. The specific epithet  is from the Latin meaning "broad-leaved".

Description
Its coriaceous leaves are elliptic to circular in shape. The flowers are either almost sessile or borne on short peduncles.

Distribution and habitat
Pentachlaena latifolia is known only from the central regions of Vakinankaratra and Amoron'i Mania.

References

Sarcolaenaceae
Endemic flora of Madagascar
Plants described in 1920
Taxa named by Joseph Marie Henry Alfred Perrier de la Bâthie